Diphenylphosphoryl azide (DPPA) is an organic compound. It is widely used as a reagent in the synthesis of other organic compounds.

Uses 

DPPA undergoes pseudohalogen replacement of the azido group by treatment with nucleophilic reagents, such as ammonia and various amines.

This compound is used as a reagent for the synthesis of peptides by virtue of its reactions with carboxylic acids leading to either the urethane or the amide. The formation of the urethane is particularly valuable since it works with carboxylic acids which fail to undergo the Schmidt reaction, and is believed to involve transfer of the azido group to the carboxylic acid.

It is now suggested that this reaction proceeds through the intermediate mixed anhydride, resulting from attack by the nucleophilic carboxylate anion on the phosphorus atom, with expulsion of the azide ion. The latter then attacks the carbonyl carbon atom, to give the acyl azide and loss of the diphenylphosphate anion, known to be a good leaving group. Finally, the acyl azide reacts in the normal manner to give the urethane.

Studies show that DPPA reacts with amines giving the corresponding phosphoramidates; it therefore appears that formation of the amide similarly involves the intermediate anhydride, followed by nucleophilic substitution by the amine.

In the synthesis of NSAIDs, DPPA is able to rearrange a propanoyl group into an isopropanoic acid.

Safety
DPPA is very toxic and a potential explosive like most other azide compounds.

See also
 Tosyl azide
 Trifluoromethanesulfonyl azide

References

Organophosphoropseudohalidates
Azido compounds
Reagents for organic chemistry
Phenol esters
Phenyl compounds